Heterometrus serratus is a species of scorpion in the family Buthidae endemic to Sri Lanka where it is restricted to southern parts.

Description
This large scorpion has a total length of about 100 to 130 mm long. Adults are uniformly reddish black to greenish black. There are 12 to 15 pectinal
teeth. Male with slightly narrower chela than female. Chela is hirsute and lobiform. Manus is covered by rounded granules that appear as rows. Pedipalp
patella lacks a pronounced internal tubercle. Carapace smooth, and glossy medially, with marginal granules. Dorsal and dorsolateral carinae of metasomal segments are granulated. Vesicle of telson is longer than aculeus.

References

Animals described in 1900